Liuqiao (zhuang: Liujgyauz Cin) is a town under the administration of Fusui County in southern Guangxi Zhuang Autonomous Region, China. , it had an area of  populated by 33,000 people residing in 1 residential communities and 12 villages.

Administrative divisions
There are 1 residential communities and 12 villages:

Residential communities:
 Qujiu(柳桥社区)

Villages:
 Leida(雷大村), Shangtun(上屯村), Baliu(岜留村), Zaowa(灶瓦村), Xincun(新村村), Quqi ( 渠齐村), Xichangn(西长村), Fuba(扶岜村), Poli(坡利村), Pokan(坡龛村), Pingpo(平坡村), Najia(那加村)

See also
List of township-level divisions of Guangxi

References

External links
 Liuqiao Town/Official website of Liuqiao

Towns of Guangxi
Fusui County